A word wall is a literacy tool composed of an organized (typically in alphabetical order) collection of words which are displayed in large visible letters on a wall, bulletin board, or other display surface in a classroom. The word wall is designed to be an interactive tool for students or others to use, and contains an array of words that can be used during writing and/or reading.

Although typically associated with reading/writing instruction, word walls are becoming commonplace in classrooms for all subject areas due to their ability to foster phonemic awareness, display connections throughout word "families" (such as "-ick" words), serve as a support/reference for students, as well as create meaningful/understandable/memorable experiences with new vocabulary words, it can help you create work better for school, work and personal.

Due to their flexible nature and ability to "grow" alongside the students, word walls can be used in classrooms ranging from pre-school through high school.

Word walls are considered to be interactive and collaborative tools, as they are a student-created and student-centered artifact. Many variations of the word wall are currently in existence, including those featuring illustrations of the words and color-coded lists.

References

culture